Isieke (or 'Isiaka) is a larger town  in Ebonyi State, Nigeria. It is the headquarters of the Ivo Local Government Area.

The town has an official Post Office.

References

ref>

Populated places in Ebonyi State